The gens Aquinia was a plebeian family in Rome.  The gens does not appear to have been particularly large or important, and is known primarily from two individuals.

Members of the gens
 Marcus Aquinius, a partisan of Gnaeus Pompeius in Africa, who took part in the war against Caesar.  After the defeat of the Pompeians, he was pardoned by Caesar.
 Aquinius, a very inferior poet, a contemporary of Catullus and Cicero.

See also
 List of Roman gentes

References

Roman gentes